Colubraria is a genus of sea snails, marine gastropod mollusks in the family Colubrariidae. Members of this genus lack a radula and feed by sucking blood from fish.

Species
Species within the genus Colubraria include:
 Colubraria acroincisa S.-I Huang & M.-H. Lin, 2019
 Colubraria albometulaformis Dekkers, 2007
 Colubraria brinkae Parth, 1992
 Colubraria buitendijki Bayer, 1933
 Colubraria canariensis Nordsieck & Talavera, 1979
 Colubraria ceylonensis Sowerby I, 1833
 Colubraria clathrata (Sowerby I, 1833)
 Colubraria cumingi (Dohrn, 1861)
 Colubraria eugenei Bozzetti & Lussi, 1991
 Colubraria gilberti D. Monsecour & Dekker, 2014 
 Colubraria harryleei D. Monsecour & K. Monsecour, 2011
 Colubraria jordani Strong, 1938
 Colubraria kathiewayana Fittkau & Parth, 1993
 Colubraria latericium Bozzetti, 2008
 Colubraria lucasensis Strong & Hertlein, 1937
 Colubraria maculosa Gmelin, 1790
 Colubraria margarethae D. Monsecour & K. Monsecour, 2011
 Colubraria mulveyana (Iredale, 1925)
 Colubraria muricata (Lightfoot, 1786)
 Colubraria myuna Garrard, 1961
  † Colubraria neozelanica Maxwell, 1966
 Colubraria nitidula (Sowerby I, 1833)
 Colubraria obscura (Reeve, 1844)
 Colubraria ochsneri Hertlein & Allison, 1968
 Colubraria procera (Sowerby I, 1832)
 Colubraria ralliserra S.-I Huang & M.-H. Lin, 2019
 Colubraria reticosa A. Adams, 1870
 Colubraria rolli Parth, 1992
 Colubraria sowerbii (Reeve, 1844)
 Colubraria springsteeni Parth, 1991
 Colubraria suduirauti Parth, 1999
  † Colubraria sutherlandi Beu, 1973
 Colubraria tchangsii Ma X. & Zhang S., 2000
 Colubraria tenera Gray, 1839
 Colubraria testacea (Morch, 1854)
 Colubraria tortuosa (Reeve, 1844)
 Colubraria tumida Ma X. & Zhang S., 2000
Species brought into synonymy
 Colubraria antiquata: synonym of Tritonoharpa antiquata (Hinds in Reeve, 1844)
 Colubraria antillana Sarasúa, 1978: synonym of Cumia antillana (Sarasúa, 1978)
 Colubraria brazieri (Angas, 1869) : synonym of Cumia brazieri (Angas, 1869)
 Colubraria castanea Kuroda & Habe, 1952: synonym of Colubraria tenera (Gray, 1839)
 Colubraria digitalis Reeve, 1844: synonym of Maculotriton serriale (Deshayes, 1834)
 Colubraria janlochi Parth, 1991: synonym of Cumia janlochi (Parth, 1991)
 Colubraria pulchrafuscata Dekkers, 2007: synonym of Colubraria springsteeni Parth, 1991
 Colubraria reticulata (de Blainville, 1829): synonym of Cumia reticulata (Blainville, 1829)
 Colubraria sunderlandi Petuch, 1995: synonym of Cumia sunderlandi (Petuch, 1995)
 Colubraria vexillata (Dall, 1908): synonym of Tritonoharpa vexillata Dall, 1908

References

External links
  ICZN 1993. Opinion 1765. Fusus Helbling, 1779 (Mollusca, Gastropoda): suppressed, and Fusinus Rafinesque, 1815 and Colubraria Schumacher, 1817: conserved. Bulletin of Zoological Nomenclature, 51(2): 159-161

Colubrariidae
Gastropod genera